The 2018–19 HT Premijer liga was the 28th season of the HT Premijer liga, the highest professional basketball league in Croatia. It started on October 6, 2018 and finished on May 30, 2019.

Format
As in the previous season, all participants in Premijer liga including teams that play ABA League joined the regular season. It was played with a double round-robin format where the eight first qualified teams joined the playoffs, while the penultimate will be play relegation playoffs and last qualified one was relegated.

Current teams

Promotion and relegation 
Teams promoted from the First League 
Bosco
Gorica 
Teams relegated to the First League 
Jazine Arbanasi
Kaštela 
Zagreb

Locations and team informations

Coaching changes

Regular season

League table

Results

Playoffs
Quarterfinals and semifinals will be played in a best-of-three-games format, while the finals in a best-of-five one.

Quarterfinals

|}

Semifinals

|}

Finals

|}

Relegation playoffs 
As of the 2018–19 season, team who lost the 2018–19 First League final and the 11th placed team of the 2018–19 Premijer liga season will play in the Qualifiers for a spot in the 2019–20 Premijer liga season.

Teams 
 11th Premijer liga team: Hermes Analitica
 2nd First League team: Dubrava

Results 
 

|}

Croatian clubs in European competitions

See also
2018–19 ABA League First Division
2018–19 ABA League Second Division
2018–19 First League
2018–19 Croatian First Women's Basketball League

References

External links
Official Site 
Scoresway Page
Eurobasket.com League Page

A-1 Liga seasons
Croatian
2018–19 in Croatian basketball